The 1996 UCI Cyclo-cross World Championships were held in Montreuil, France from 3-4 February 1996. This was the first year that the under-23 race was held.

Medal summary

Results

Elite

Under-23

References

UCI Cyclo-cross World Championships
Cyclo-cross
International cycle races hosted by Germany
UCI Cyclo-cross World Championships